Baba Is You is a puzzle video game created by Finnish independent developer Arvi Teikari (known professionally as Hempuli). Originating as a short demo built for the 2017 Nordic Game Jam, the game was expanded and released on 13 March 2019 for PC and Nintendo Switch. Mobile versions were released in June 2021. The game centers around the manipulation of "rules"—represented in the play area by movable tiles with words written on them—in order to allow the player character, usually the titular Baba, to reach a specified goal. A free update titled "Baba Make Level" was released on November 17, 2021, featuring over 150 new and previously unused levels and a level editor with online sharing.

Gameplay 

In each level, the player is presented with a one-screen puzzle consisting of various objects, characters, and movable word tiles. The player is given control of one or more characters or objects on the screen (most often the player controls a character named Baba). When three or more word tiles (minimally consisting of one object, one verb, and one property or object) are aligned vertically or horizontally into a valid syntax, they create a rule that determines how the object behaves and that will be enforced until the string is broken up. For example, the goal can be changed by moving  and  blocks to apply to another object, and the player can pass through objects by removing the  trait from them. Specific rules for a level can be placed in a way that the tiles cannot be broken up (for instance, by having the rule placed in a corner), committing that rule for the entire level. The player completes a level when an object that is the subject of an  rule (i.e. an active player-character) touches any object that is the subject of an  rule (i.e. an active goal). The game contains over 200 levels, with the player eventually having to manipulate rules around the map screen.

Development and release 

The theme of the 2017 Nordic Game Jam was "Not There", which prompted Teikari, a student at the University of Helsinki who had previously developed the Metroidvania-genre game Environmental Station Alpha, to envision a game concept based on manipulating logic operators. He explained that levels were often created by brainstorming a "cool" or "amusing" solution, and then coming up with how the player would accomplish it. Teikari noted that "the most satisfying moments in puzzle games are those which present the player with simple but hard-to-wrap-your-head-around situations, so that solving the puzzle is about figuring out that one neat trick/twist". As with his previous projects, the game was developed using Multimedia Fusion 2, and a Lua scripting plugin; Teikari credited his friend Lukas Meller for help with the Lua implementations. Teikari wrote on Reddit that the naming of the characters Baba and Keke was inspired by the bouba/kiki effect.

Teikari stated in 2017 that he planned to release the full game in 2018, and placed a development version of the title for download at itch.io. After Baba Is You won at the Independent Games Festival in March 2018, a clone of the game was released by a French publisher on the App Store, using nearly the same graphics and calling itself the same name. Teikari worked with the French division of Apple to remove the offending app.

The game, and a Nintendo Switch release, were focused upon in a Nintendo indie games showcase presentation on 31 August 2018. Baba Is You was released on 13 March 2019, via Steam for Microsoft Windows, Linux, and macOS, and on Nintendo Switch.

A cross-platform level editor, with online level sharing, was added to the game on November 17, 2021, as a free update for the personal computer and Switch versions. This update included 150 additional levels in two new level packs, and added various new rules, art, and soundtracks.

Alongside programming the game, Teikari also composed the soundtrack using OpenMPT. Shortly before the release of the level editor update, he released the music project files via the official Baba Is You Twitter account.

Mobile versions for iOS and Android devices were released on 22 June 2021.

Reception 

Baba Is You won first place at the 2017 Nordic Game Jam. It was nominated for the Seumas McNally Grand Prize and won awards for "Best Student Game" and "Excellence In Design" at the 2018 IGF Awards. It was also nominated for "Best Indie Game" at the 2019 Golden Joystick Awards, for "Indie Game of the Year" at the Titanium Awards, and for "Best Independent Game" at The Game Awards 2019, and won the award for "Outstanding Achievement in Game Design" for the 23rd Annual D.I.C.E. Awards; in addition, it was nominated for "Gameplay Design, New IP" at the NAVGTR Awards, for "Game Design" and "Original Property" at the 16th British Academy Games Awards, and for "Best Indie Game" at the Famitsu Dengeki Game Awards 2019, and won the award for "Best Design" and the "Innovation Award" at the 20th Game Developers Choice Awards. The PC version of the game was among the best-selling new releases of the month on Steam.

Baba Is You received "generally favorable reviews", according to review aggregator Metacritic. Polygon considered it "one of the best puzzle video games in years", with the reviewer observing that it "asks me to toss my assumptions about how rules in video games work, to analyze how and why they exist in the first place. And that sort of reprogramming of my brain, oddly enough, happens best when the game is turned off". Pocket Gamer was similarly positive, describing it as a "ridiculously complex puzzler that has you questioning not only every decision you make, but how anyone managed to think up something so bizarre", and concluding that it was one of the "most inventive, exciting puzzle games you will ever play. It's beautifully simple in its graphics and its core design, but it'll make your brain hurt with how nonsensical the solutions appear to be".

A criticized aspect of the game is its level of difficulty. Game Informer expressed dissatisfaction with the overcomplication that arises from the compounding of variables in later stages of the game, which often resulted in "exhausting and unsatisfying" gameplay. GameSpot also criticized the increasing difficulty of later puzzles caused by the language of the operating words, saying that "as the language involved gets more complex, words are ushered in whose meaning seems vague and whose purpose remains hazy, and that can make certain puzzles infuriatingly obscure".

Notes

References

Further reading

External links 
 
 Demo version
 Level Editor

2019 video games
Game jam video games
Android (operating system) games
Indie video games
iOS games
Linux games
MacOS games
Nintendo Switch games
Puzzle video games
Video games about animals
Video games developed in Finland
Windows games
Clickteam Fusion games
Single-player video games
Video games with user-generated gameplay content
Independent Games Festival winners
Game Developers Choice Award winners
Video games designed by Arvi Teikari